Szałot is a Silesian potato salad made with diced, boiled potatoes, carrots, peas, ham, various sausages, pickled fish, boiled eggs, and bonded with olive oil or mayonnaise.

References 

Silesian cuisine
Salads
Potato dishes